Ira Sullivan Does It All is an album by multi-instrumentalist Ira Sullivan which was recorded in 1981 and released on the Muse label in 1983.

Reception

The AllMusic review by Scott Yanow stated "Most of the recordings by the early-'80s Red Rodney-Ira Sullivan Quintet were issued under Rodney's name, but this outing for Muse was an exception. .. this was a mighty group that consistently inspired Rodney to play music more advanced than bebop. Sullivan, who switches between soprano, alto and flugelhorn, matched well with Rodney ... Recommended".

Track listing
 "Sovereign Court" (Lou Berryman) – 3:27
 "The More I See You" (Harry Warren, Mack Gordon) – 3:49  
 "Prelude to a Kiss" (Duke Ellington, Irving Gordon, Irving Mills) – 4:37
 "Together" (Ray Henderson, Lew Brown, Buddy DeSylva) – 3:50
 "Amazing Grace" (Traditional) – 3:50
 "Central Park West"  (John Coltrane) – 7:33 
 "Dolphin Dance" (Herbie Hancock) – 10:48

Personnel
Ira Sullivan - soprano saxophone, alto saxophone, flugelhorn
Red Rodney – trumpet, flugelhorn (tracks 1, 4, 6 & 7)
Michael Rabinowitz – bassoon (tracks 6 & 7)
Garry Dial – piano (tracks 1-4, 6 & 7)
Jay Anderson – bass (tracks 1, 2 & 4-7)
Steve Bagby – drums (tracks 1, 2 & 4-7)

References

Muse Records albums
Ira Sullivan albums
1983 albums
Albums produced by Bob Porter (record producer)